was a Japanese samurai active in the early Edo period. Araki Mataemon was the founder of the koryū martial art Yagyū Shingan-ryū, known sometimes as Yagyū Shingan-ryū Taijutsu.

Araki Matemon studied Yagyū Shinkage-ryū under Yagyū Munenori and later received permission from Yagyū Jūbei to use the Yagyū family-name in the Yagyū Shingan-ryū.

Araki Mataemon was a very strong warrior, and his feud against the samurai Kawai Matagorō is one of the most famous in Japan, called Igagoe vendetta. Matagoro killed Gendayu, the little brother of Mataemon's brother-in-law, Watanabe Kazuma. Becoming a murderer out of jealousy for a childhood friend, Matagoro fled into another domain, using friends of his father and his lineage linked to Tokugawa Ieyasu. Watanabe eventually located him in the neighborhood of Iga-Ueno. By now, Watanabe Kazuma had been joined in his revenge by Araki Mataemon.

"On the seventh day of the eleventh month of 1634", Watanabe Kazuma, Araki Mataemon, and two other men waited for Kawai Matagoro at the Kagiya crossroads in Iga-Ueno. They had been informed of Matagoro's route. That morning the road was frozen, Mataemon and his followers entered a nearby shop and waited for Matagoro to arrive from Osaka. When the arrived, Mataemon killed Matagoro's uncle, Kawai Jinzaemon, and the followers who surround Matagoro. Historian Stephen Turnbull wrote, that:

Araki Mataemon died by poison in 1638. The culprit was never found.

References

Japanese swordfighters of the Edo period
1590s births
1638 deaths